1% (also known as Outlaws) is a 2017 Australian biker film directed by Stephen McCallum and starring Ryan Corr, Abbey Lee and Matt Nable, who also wrote the film. It premiered at the 2017 Toronto International Film Festival in September 2017 where the film was acquired by A24 for North American distribution.

Premise
Set within the primal underworld of outlaw motorcycle club gangs, the film follows the heir to the throne of a motorcycle club, who has to save his brother's life by betraying his president.

Cast
 Matt Nable as President Knuck
 Ryan Corr as Vice President Paddo
 Abbey Lee as Katrina
 Simone Kessell as Hayley
 Josh McConville as Skink
 Aaron Pedersen as Sugar
 Sam Parsonson as Knuckle
 Eddie Baroo as Webby
 Jacqui Williams as Josie

Release
1% had its world premiere in the Discovery section at the 2017 Toronto International Film Festival on 9 September 2017. A24 and DirecTV Cinema subsequently acquired the North American distribution rights to the film, for a tentative 2019 wide release.

Reception

Box office
The film grossed $76,151 in worldwide theatrical box office, all within Australia.

Critical response
On review aggregator website Rotten Tomatoes, the film holds an approval rating of 47% based on 17 reviews and an average rating of 3.68/10. On Metacritic, the film has a weighted average score of 24 out of 100, based on 4 critics, indicating "generally unfavorable reviews".

Accolades

References

External links
 

2017 films
2017 crime films
A24 (company) films
Australian crime films
2010s English-language films
Outlaw biker films
Films set in Perth, Western Australia
Films shot in Perth, Western Australia
2010s American films